Popovka is a rural locality (a selo) in Narodnenskoye Rural Settlement, Ternovsky District, Voronezh Oblast, Russia. The population was 246 as of 2010. There are 5 streets.

Geography 
Popovka is located on the right bank of the Karachan River, 30 km southeast of Ternovka (the district's administrative centre) by road. Narodnoye is the nearest rural locality.

References 

Rural localities in Ternovsky District